John Mahon (12 February 1940 – 23 November 2014) was an Australian rules footballer who played with Collingwood in the Victorian Football League (VFL) during the 1960s.

After playing 30 games in his two years at Collingwood, Mahon injured his ankle in 1963 and made just one appearance that season. He recovered to play all 23 games in 1964 and was Collingwood's centre half-back in the grand final side which lost to Melbourne.

He played one more season with Collingwood and then joined Victorian Football Association club Prahran.

The Mahon family used to own the Yarra Hotel in Abbotsford.

References

1940 births
2014 deaths
Australian rules footballers from Victoria (Australia)
Collingwood Football Club players
Prahran Football Club players
People educated at Xavier College